Saud Al Kabeer bin Abdulaziz Al Saud ( Suʿūd Al Kabīr ibn ʿAbdulʿazīz Āl Suʿūd; 1882–1959) was a grandson of Saud bin Faisal bin Turki and a cousin and important supporter of King Abdulaziz, founder of Saudi Arabia. Prince Saud was one of the most known Najdi people. Through his marriages he was the brother-in-law, and later he became the son-in-law, of King Abdulaziz. Saud was married for 45 years to King Abdulaziz's eldest sister Noura bint Abdul Rahman, and after her death in 1950 he married the King's daughter Princess Hessa.

Early life and activities
Prince Saud was born in Riyadh in 1882. He was the eldest son of Abdulaziz bin Saud Al Saud and Wahda bint Hazam Al Hithlain of Ajman. His grandfather, Saud bin Faisal bin Turki, and great-grandfather, Faisal bin Turki bin Abdullah, were the rulers of the Second Saudi State.

Following the capture of Riyadh by the Rashidi Emir Muhammad bin Abdullah in 1891 Saud and his relatives were arrested and taken to Qasim. In 1904 Abdulaziz took Qasim where he found that Prince Saud and his five brothers were there under the rule of the Al Rashid. Abdulaziz brought all of his cousins whom he called al araif (Arabic: lost and recollected camels) to Riyadh and made them part of his circle, but gave them no political position. Prince Saud, his brothers and a few of his cousins challenged the rule of Abdulaziz bin Abdul Rahman. In 1910 when Abdulaziz was not in Riyadh, Prince Saud and his brothers left Riyadh and joined the rebellious Ajman tribe with whom they established a base in Hariq and Hauta in the south of Riyadh. In 1912 Abdulaziz attacked on them and asked them either to return to Riyadh with him or to go into exile. Prince Saud and his brother Mohammed chose to return with him, but one of his brothers escaped to Hasa while the others chose to refuge with Sharif Hussein of Hejaz who was the competitor of Abdulaziz.

Following this incident Prince Saud played a vital role in uniting the kingdom of Saudi Arabia, having fought side by side with Abdulaziz in many battles and having led the armies to reclaim many lands. He helped reclaim Ha'il, Jeddah, and Sablah. He played a pivotal role in the battles of the Al Qassim region. He also led the Saudi army to reclaim the west coast of the Arabian peninsula including Rabigh, Yanbu, and Medina. Prince Saud and Abdulaziz's brother Muhammad bin Abdul Rahman led the forces which helped Abdulaziz in the battle of Kanzan in 1915. Only through their assistance Abdulaziz managed to defeat the Al Ajman tribe who surrounded Abdulaziz's forces for almost six months after killing Abdulaziz's younger brother Saad bin Abdul Rahman and wounding Abdulaziz. Later Prince Saud was made governor of Al Qassim. Because he was respected and loved by the people, and also due to his vast knowledge of religion, King Abdulaziz would rely on Prince Saud to dispute tribal issues.

Personal life

Prince Saud married to Noura bint Abdul Rahman, the daughter of Abdul Rahman bin Faisal and sister of King Abdulaziz. Saud's brother, Mohammed, also married a daughter of Abdul Rahman, Mounira. And later on after Noura's death, Saud married Hessa, the daughter of King Abdulaziz. Prince Saud and Princess Noura had two daughters, Hassa and Al Jawhara, and a son, Mohammed who was a senior and respected prince due to his powerful tribal knowledge and connections. Princess Al Jawhara was one of King Faisal's spouses. 

Prince Saud and his wife, Noura, lived in Sharia Palace in Alkharag city. Then, they moved to the newly built Al Shamsiah Palace, outside Riyadh which is in the Al Murabba neighborhood. 

One of Prince Saud's great grandsons, Turki bin Saud bin Turki, was executed in October 2016 due to his killing of a friend in 2013. 

Prince Saud died in 1959.

References

External links

Saud
1882 births
1959 deaths
Saud
Saud
Saud
19th-century Saudi Arabian poets